Inkling may refer to:
 Inkling (company), an American educational technology company
 The Inkling, a 2000 album by Nels Cline
 Inkling (Splatoon), a fictional species from the Splatoon video game series
 The Inklings, an Oxford literary discussion group
 Wacom Inkling, a digital sketch pen

See also